KITSAT-1 or KITSAT-A (Korean Institute of Technology Satellite) is the first satellite to be launched for the South Korea. Once launched, the satellite was given the nickname "Our Star" (우리별). The KITSAT-1 is a low Earth orbit (LEO) satellite with a modular structure. Of the 12 satellites launched by South Korea, KITSAT-1 has the highest altitude. While the KITSAT-1 maintains equilibrium by gravity gradient forces, magnetic torque can be used to control attitude if needed. The forecasted lifespan of the KITSAT-1 was only five years, but communication with the satellite was maintained for 12 years. Since the launch of the KITSAT-1, South Korea has launched an additional 36 satellites.

Size 
The KITSAT-1 is considered to be a small-sized or microsatellite. The KITSAT-1 is the smallest sized low Earth orbit satellite that has been launched by South Korea.

On-Board Computer System 
The KITSAT-1's On-board computer (OBC) system uses an OBC186 for the main OBC and an OBC80 as the backup On-board computer system.

Instruments 
It carried a Digital Store and Forward Communication Experiment (DSFCE), a CCD Earth Imaging System (CEIS), a Digital Signal Processing Experiment (DSPE), a Cosmic Ray Experiment (CRE).

CCD Earth Imaging System 
The CCD Earth Imaging System is equipped with two different cameras. These cameras are: a wide-angle camera with 4 km/pixel and a high-resolution camera with 400 m/pixel. The two CCD cameras that are equipped on the KITSAT-1 are located on the bottom of the satellite so that the cameras should always be pointed toward Earth

Cosmic Ray Experiment 
The CRE's main purpose aboard the KITSAT-1 was to monitor and study the space radiation at  orbit of the Earth. These space radiation measurements were to be taken in short-term and long-term time frames. The CRE is equipped to measure the high energy protons, the Galactic Cosmic Rays from deep space, and also the Solar Cosmic Rays from solar flares.

The CRE payload consists of two subsystems. The two subsystems are the Cosmic Particle Experiment (CPE) and the Total Dose Experiment (TDE). The CPE is used to measure the Linear Energy Transfer (LET) spectrum over short-term time frames and the TDE is used to measure the total accumulated ionizing radiation dose over long-term time frames.

Launch 

Launched in 1992, KITSAT-1, which stands for the Korea Institute of Technology Satellite-1, is the first satellite developed by SaTReC. Developed through a collaborative program between SaTReC and the University of Surrey, United Kingdom, the main objective of the KITSAT-1 program was to acquire satellite technology through the training and education of satellite engineers.

The orbit of the KITSAT-1 is of 1320 km with 66° of the orbital inclination. This orbit lies just within the inner Van Allen radiation belt.

The success of the KITSAT-1 program marked the beginning of space technology development for South Korea.

Placed into orbit on 10 August 1992, and launched from Centre Spatial Guyanais (CSG), its launch weight was 48.6 kg, and it measured 35.2 cm x 35.6 cm x 67 cm. The console of the University of Surrey UoSAT-5 satellite was used.

KITSAT-1 was launched on an Ariane 42P H-10 launch vehicle along with NASA's TOPEX/Poseidon satellite and France's S80/T satellite.

South Korea became the 22nd country to operate a satellite.

See also 

 KITSAT-2
 KITSAT-3

References 

Spacecraft launched in 1992
Satellites orbiting Earth
Satellites of South Korea
First artificial satellites of a country
Amateur radio satellites